The Houston Astros' 2009 season is the 48th season for the franchise in the National League in Houston, Texas and their 10th season at Minute Maid Park.  The Houston Astros attempted to win the NL Central for the fifth time (1997, 1998, 1999 and 2001), but failed.

Regular season

April
The Astros lost their season opening series against the Cubs, their one win coming off of former Cincinnati Red Jeff Keppinger's tenth inning RBI single in his first at bat with the club. They were then swept by the Cardinals in St. Louis in a three-game series, giving up 19 runs while only being able to score 5 runs. The team then traveled to Pittsburgh where they lost the first game 7-0.  The next day, Mike Hampton won his second start of his second stint with the franchise with an 8 strikeout, 6 inning outing for the win over the Pirates.  Lance Berkman's 6th inning 3 run home run helped the Astros win the third game of the series against the Pirates.  The Astros then returned home to Minute Maid Park, where they had three good outings against the Reds by ace Roy Oswalt, journeyman Wandy Rodríguez and Triple-A Round Rock call-up Felipe Paulino. José Valverde gave up a 2-run home run in the top of the ninth inning to Ramón Hernández for the loss in Oswalt's game on April 17, Rodriguez's got the win with a strong offensive outing by the Astros led by Geoff Blum with 3 RBIs on April 18, and Geoff Geary gave up a two-run double to Micah Owings in the top of the seventh inning for the loss in Paulino's game on April 19. In the fourth game of the series, Lance Berkman and Carlos Lee's back to back solo shot home runs were not enough to beat the Red's Edwin Encarnación's 2 RBI single and Joey Votto's 2 RBI double to give the Red's the series, 3–1. The Houston Astros are an even 451 wins and 451 losses against the Chicago Cubs

Season standings

Record vs. opponents

Game log 

|-  bgcolor="ffbbbb"
|- align="center" bgcolor="ffbbbb"
| 1 || April 6 || Cubs || 4–2 || Zambrano (1–0) || Oswalt (0–1) || Gregg (1) || 43,827 || 0–1
|- align="center" bgcolor="bbffbb"
| 2 || April 7 || Cubs || 3–2 (10) || Brocail (1–0) || Cotts (0–1) || || 31,121 || 1–1
|- align="center" bgcolor="ffbbbb"
| 3 || April 8 || Cubs || 11–6 || Lilly (1–0) || Moehler (0–1) || || 30,047 || 1–2
|- align="center" bgcolor="ffbbbb"
| 4 || April 10 || @ Cardinals || 5–3 || Piñeiro (1–0) || Hampton (0–1) || McClellan (1) || 37,224 || 1–3
|- align="center" bgcolor="ffbbbb"
| 5 || April 11 || @ Cardinals || 11–2 || Wainwright (1–0) || Oswalt (0–2) || || 43,454 || 1–4
|- align="center" bgcolor="ffbbbb"
| 6 || April 12 || @ Cardinals || 3–0 || Lohse (2–0) || Rodríguez (0–1) || || 36,310 || 1–5
|- align="center" bgcolor="ffbbbb"
| 7 || April 13 || @ Pirates || 7–0 || Duke (2–0) || Moehler (0–2) || || 38,411 || 1–6
|- align="center" bgcolor="bbffbb"
| 8 || April 15 || @ Pirates || 4–1 || Hampton (1–1) || Ohlendorf (0–2) || || 20,690 || 2–6
|- align="center" bgcolor="bbffbb"
| 9 || April 16 || @ Pirates || 6–3 || Wright (1–0) || Burnett (0–1) || Hawkins (1) || 13,877 || 3–6
|- align="center" bgcolor="ffbbbb"
| 10 || April 17 || Reds || 2–1 || Masset (1–0) || Valverde (0–1) || Cordero (3) || 32,268 || 3–7
|- align="center" bgcolor="bbffbb"
| 11 || April 18 || Reds || 7–0 || Rodríguez (1–1) || Harang (1–2) || || 30,141 || 4–7
|- align="center" bgcolor="ffbbbb"
| 12 || April 19 || Reds || 4–2 || Vólquez (2–1) || Geary (0–1) || Cordero (4) || 29,372 || 4–8
|- align="center" bgcolor="ffbbbb"
| 13 || April 20 || Reds || 4–3 || Arroyo (3–0) || Geary (0–2) || Cordero (5) || 23,308 || 4–9
|- align="center" bgcolor="bbffbb"
| 14 || April 21 || Dodgers || 8–5 || Ortiz (1–0) || Kershaw (0–1) || Valverde (1) || 26,360 || 5–9
|- align="center" bgcolor="bbffbb"
| 15 || April 22 || Dodgers || 6–5 || Sampson (1–0) || Belisario (0–1) || Hawkins (2) || 26,725 || 6–9
|- align="center" bgcolor="ffbbbb"
| 16 || April 23 || Dodgers || 2–0 || Billingsley (4–0) || Rodríguez (1–2) || Broxton (5) || 26,081 || 6–10
|- align="center" bgcolor="ffbbbb"
| 17 || April 24 || Brewers || 5–2 || Gallardo (2–1) || Paulino (0–1) || || 25,316 || 6–11
|- align="center" bgcolor="ffbbbb"
| 18 || April 25 || Brewers || 9–8 (11) || DiFelice (1–0) || Geary (0–3) || || 31,355 || 6–12
|- align="center" bgcolor="bbffbb"
| 19 || April 26 || Brewers || 3–2 || Ortiz (2–0) || Parra (0–4) || Valverde (2) || 27,690 || 7–12
|- align="center" bgcolor="bbffbb"
| 20 || April 27 || @ Reds || 4–1 || Sampson (2–0) || Cordero (0–1) || || 12,365 || 8–12
|- align="center" bgcolor="bbffbb"
| 21 || April 28 || @ Reds || 8–3 || Rodríguez (2–2) || Harang (2–3) || || 9,878 || 9–12
|- align="center" bgcolor="ffbbbb"
| 22 || April 29 || @ Reds || 3–0 || Vólquez (3–2) || Paulino (0–2) || Cordero (7) || 12,681 || 9–13
|-

|-  bgcolor="ffbbbb"
|- align="center" bgcolor="ffbbbb"
| 23 || May 1 || @ Braves || 7–2 || Lowe (3–1) || Hampton (1–2) || || 29,309 || 9–14
|- align="center" bgcolor="bbffbb"
| 24 || May 2 || @ Braves || 5–1 || Byrdak (1–0) || Carlyle (0–1) || || 28,203 || 10–14
|- align="center" bgcolor="bbffbb"
| 25 || May 3 || @ Braves || 7–5 || Geary (1–3) || Moylan (1–2) || Hawkins (3) || 27,921 || 11–14
|- align="center" bgcolor="ffbbbb"
| 26 || May 4 || @ Nationals || 9–4 || Lannan (1–3) || Wright (1–1) || || 14,115 || 11–15
|- align="center" bgcolor="ffbbbb"
| 27 || May 5*  || @ Nationals || 11–10 || Hanrahan (1–1) || Hawkins (0–1) (1–1) || || 19,328 || 11–16
|- align="center" bgcolor="ffbbbb"
| 28 || May 6 || Cubs || 6–3 || Harden (3–1) || Hampton (1–3) || Gregg (5) || 29,415 || 11–17
|- align="center" bgcolor="ffbbbb"
| 29 || May 7 || Cubs || 8–5 || Lilly (4–2) || Ortiz (2–1) || || 28,625 || 11–18
|- align="center" bgcolor="bbffbb"
| 30 || May 8 || Padres || 2–0 || Rodríguez (3–2) || Gaudin (0–2) || Hawkins (4) || 28,139 || 12–18
|- align="center" bgcolor="bbffbb"
| 31 || May 9 || Padres || 5–4 || Hawkins (1–0) || Gregerson (0–3) || || 29,141 || 13–18
|- align="center" bgcolor="bbffbb"
| 32 || May 10 || Padres || 12–5 || Oswalt (1–2) || Geer (0–1) || || 30,023 || 14–18
|- align="center" bgcolor="ffbbbb"
| 33 || May 12 || @ Rockies || 12–1 || Jiménez (3–4) || Paulino (0–3) || || 23,233 || 14–19
|- align="center" bgcolor="bbffbb"
| 34 || May 13 || @ Rockies || 15–11 || Hampton (2–3) || Marquis (4–3) || || 19,226 || 15–19
|- align="center" bgcolor="bbffbb"
| 35 || May 14 || @ Rockies || 5–3 || Rodríguez (4–2) || Hammel (0–2) || Hawkins (5) || 22,696 || 16–19
|- align="center" bgcolor="bbbbbb"
| || May 15  || @ Cubs || colspan=6 |Postponed
|- align="center" bgcolor="ffbbbb"
| 36 || May 16 || @ Cubs || 5–4 || Marshall (2–2) || Hawkins (1–1) || || 40,549 || 16–20
|- align="center" bgcolor="bbffbb"
| 37 || May 17 || @ Cubs || 6–5 || Moehler (1–2) || Harden (4–2) || Sampson (1) || 40,478 || 17–20
|- align="center" bgcolor="ffbbbb"
| 38 || May 19 || Brewers || 4–2 || Bush (3–0) || Ortiz (2–2) || Hoffman (10) || 29,343 || 17–21
|- align="center" bgcolor="bbffbb"
| 39 || May 20 || Brewers || 6–4 || Rodríguez (5–2) || Gallardo (4–2) || Sampson (2) || 27,160 || 18–21
|- align="center" bgcolor="ffbbbb"
| 40 || May 21 || Brewers || 4–3 || McClung (1–1) || Fulchino (0–1) || Hoffman (11) || 25,037 || 18–22
|- align="center" bgcolor="ffbbbb"
| 41 || May 22 || Rangers || 6–5 (10) || O'Day (2–0) || Hawkins (1–2) || Francisco (10) || 36,017 || 18–23
|- align="center" bgcolor="ffbbbb"
| 42 || May 23 || Rangers || 6–3 || Feldman (3–0) || Moehler (1–3) || Wilson (3) || 36,019 || 18–24
|- align="center" bgcolor="ffbbbb"
| 43 || May 24 || Rangers || 5–0 || McCarthy (4–2) || Hampton (2–4) || || 36,749 || 18–25
|- align="center" bgcolor="ffbbbb"
| 44 || May 25 || @ Reds || 8–5 || Harang (5–4) || Rodríguez (5–3) || Cordero (12) || 17,818 || 18–26
|- align="center" bgcolor="ffbbbb"
| 45 || May 26 || @ Reds || 6–4 || Masset (2–0) || Byrdak (1–1) || Cordero (13) || 15,619 || 18–27
|- align="center" bgcolor="ffbbbb"
| 46 || May 27 || @ Reds || 6–1 || Arroyo (7–3) || Paulino (0–4) || || 17,602 || 18–28
|- align="center" bgcolor="bbffbb"
| 47 || May 29 || @ Pirates || 6–1 || Moehler (2–3) || Ohlendorf (5–5) || || 18,236 || 19–28
|- align="center" bgcolor="ffbbbb"
| 48 || May 30 || @ Pirates || 7–4 || Karstens (2–2) || Rodríguez (5–4) || Capps (10) || 37,167 || 19–29
|- align="center" bgcolor="bbffbb"
| 49 || May 31 || @ Pirates || 2–1 || Hampton (3–4) || Maholm (3–2) || Hawkins (6) || 19,566 || 20–29
|-
| colspan=9 | *Game suspended, completed on July 9 at Minute Maid Park.
|-

|-  bgcolor="ffbbbb"
|- align="center" bgcolor="bbffbb"
| 50 || June 1 || Rockies || 4–1 || Oswalt (2–2) || Cook (3–3) || Hawkins (7) || 24,016 || 21–29
|- align="center" bgcolor="bbffbb"
| 51 || June 2 || Rockies || 3–2 (11) || Ortiz (3–2) || Fogg (0–1) || || 24,041 || 22–29
|- align="center" bgcolor="bbffbb"
| 52 || June 3 || Rockies || 6–4 || Byrdak (2–1) || Marquis (7–4) || Sampson (3) || 22,032 || 23–29
|- align="center" bgcolor="ffbbbb"
| 53 || June 4 || Rockies || 10–3 || Hammel (2–3) || Rodríguez (5–5) || || 26,671 || 23–30
|- align="center" bgcolor="bbffbb"
| 54 || June 5 || Pirates || 9–1 || Hampton (4–4) || Karstens (2–3) || || 26,222 || 24–30
|- align="center" bgcolor="ffbbbb"
| 55 || June 6 || Pirates || 6–4 || Maholm (4–2) || Oswalt (2–3) || Capps (13) || 26,099 || 24–31
|- align="center" bgcolor="bbffbb"
| 56 || June 7 || Pirates || 6–4 || Fulchino (1–1) || Jackson (1–1) || Hawkins (8) || 25,729 || 25–31
|- align="center" bgcolor="ffbbbb"
| 57|| June 9 || Cubs || 7–1 || Lilly (7–4) || Moehler (2–4) || || 29,669 || 25–32
|- align="center" bgcolor="bbffbb"
| 58 || June 10 || Cubs || 2–1 || Sampson (3–0) || Guzmán (2–1) || || 29,840 || 26–32
|- align="center" bgcolor="bbffbb"
| 59 || June 11 || Cubs || 2–1 (13) || Fulchino (2–1) || Ascanio (0–1) || || 34,250 || 27–32
|- align="center" bgcolor="ffbbbb"
| 60 || June 12 || @ Diamondbacks || 8–1 || Haren (5–4) || Hampton (4–5) || || 22,225 || 27–33
|- align="center" bgcolor="bbffbb"
| 61 || June 13 || @ Diamondbacks || 6–4 || Oswalt (3–3) || Garland (4–7) || Hawkins (9) || 29,206 || 28–33
|- align="center" bgcolor="bbffbb"
| 62 || June 14 || @ Diamondbacks || 8–3 || Moehler (3–4) || Buckner (2–3) || || 26,937 || 29–33
|- align="center" bgcolor="ffbbbb"
| 63 || June 16 || @ Rangers || 6–1 || Millwood (7–4) || Rodríguez (5–6) || || 21,676 || 29–34
|- align="center" bgcolor="ffbbbb"
| 64 || June 17 || @ Rangers || 5–4 (10) || Wilson (4–3) || Fulchino (2–2) || || 32,425 || 29–35
|- align="center" bgcolor="bbffbb"
| 65 || June 18 || @ Rangers || 5–3  || Arias (1–0)  || Jennings (2–2)   || Valverde (3) || 25,445  || 30–35
|- align="center" bgcolor="ffbbbb"
| 66 || June 19 || @ Twins || 5–2 || Slowey (10–2)  || Oswalt (3–4)   || Nathan (16) || 32,218 || 30–36
|- align="center" bgcolor="bbffbb"
| 67 || June 20 || @ Twins || 6–5 || Moehler (4–3)  || Henn (0–3) || Valverde (4) || 34,710 || 31–36
|- align="center" bgcolor="bbffbb"
| 68 || June 21 || @ Twins || 4–1 || Rodríguez (6–6)  || Perkins (2–4)   || Valverde (5) || 39,659 || 32–36
|- align="center" bgcolor="ffbbbb"
| 69 || June 23 || Royals || 2–1 || Greinke (9–3)  || Ortiz (3–3)  || Soria (8) || 30,049 || 32–37
|- align="center" bgcolor="ffbbbb"
| 70|| June 24 || Royals || 4–3 || Soria (2–0)  || Fulchino (2–3)  || Bale (1) || 28,602 || 32–38
|- align="center" bgcolor="bbffbb"
| 71 || June 25 || Royals || 5–4 || Wright (2–1)  || Bannister (5–5)  || Valverde (6) || 32,048 || 33–38
|- align="center" bgcolor="bbffbb"
| 72 || June 26 || Tigers || 5–4 || Sampson (4–0)   || Zumaya (3–2)   || Hawkins (10) || 33,052 || 34–38
|- align="center" bgcolor="bbffbb"
| 73 || June 27 || Tigers || 8–1 || Paulino (2–4) || Figaro (1–1) || || 37,123 || 35–38
|- align="center" bgcolor="ffbbbb"
| 74 || June 28 || Tigers || 4–3 || Seay (1–1)   || Valverde (0–2)   || Rodney (17) || 34,041 || 35–39
|- align="center" bgcolor="bbffbb"
| 75 || June 29 || @ Padres || 3–1 || Oswalt  (4–4) || Geer (1–3) || || 15,671 || 36–39
|- align="center" bgcolor="ffbbbb"
| 76 || June 30 || @ Padres || 4–3 || Banks (1–0)  || Sampson (4–1) || Bell (22) || 15,276 || 36–40
|-

|-  bgcolor="ffbbbb"
|- align="center" bgcolor="bbffbb"
| 77 || July 1 || @ Padres || 7–1 || Moehler (5–4) || Silva ((0–2) || || 16,670 || 37–40
|- align="center" bgcolor="bbffbb"
| 78 || July 2 || @ Padres || 7–2 || Rodríguez (7–6) || Correia (5–6)  || || 23,284 || 38–40
|- align="center" bgcolor="ffbbbb"
| 79 || July 3 || @ Giants || 13–0 || Sadowski (2–0) || Paulino (2–5)  || || 42,199 || 38–41
|- align="center" bgcolor="ffbbbb"
| 80 || July 4 || @ Giants || 9–0 || Lincecum (9–2) || Ortiz (3–4) || || 34,582 || 38–42
|- align="center" bgcolor="bbffbb"
| 81 || July 5 || @ Giants || 7–1 || Oswalt (5–4) || Johnson (8–6) || || 30,157 || 39–42
|- align="center" bgcolor="bbffbb"
| 82 || July 6 || Pirates || 4–1 || Hampton (5–5) || Vasquez (1–2) || Valverde (7) || 26,834 || 40–42
|- align="center" bgcolor="ffbbbb"
| 83 || July 7 || Pirates || 6–3 || Maholm (6–4) || Moehler (5–5) || Capps (13) || 27,142 || 40–43
|- align="center" bgcolor="bbffbb"
| 84 || July 8 || Pirates || 5–0 || Rodríguez (8–6) || Morton (1–2) || || 29,243 || 41–43
|- align="center" bgcolor="bbffbb"
| 85 || July 9 || Nationals || 9–4 || Arias (2–0) || Lannan (6–6) || || 25,490 || 42–43
|- align="center" bgcolor="bbffbb"
| 86 || July 10 || Nationals || 6–5 || Fulchino (3–3) || Beimel (0–5) || || 33,085 || 43–43
|- align="center" bgcolor="ffbbbb"
| 87 || July 11 || Nationals || 13–2 || Stammen (2–4) || Hampton (5–6) || || 30,052 || 43–44
|- align="center" bgcolor="bbffbb"
| 88 || July 12 || Nationals || 5–0 || Moehler (6–5) || Zimmermann (3–4) || Valverde  (8)|| 28,680 || 44–44
|- align="center" bgcolor="bbffbb"
| 89 || July 16 || @ Dodgers || 3–0 || Rodríguez (9–6) || Wolf (4–4) || Valverde (9) || 45,970 || 45–44
|- align="center" bgcolor="bbffbb"
| 90 || July 17 || @ Dodgers || 8–1 || Oswalt (6–4) || Chad Billingsley (9–5) || || 51,209 || 46–44
|- align="center" bgcolor="ffbbbb"
| 91 || July 18 || @ Dodgers || 5–2 || Kershaw (8–5) || Hampton || Broxton (21) || 48,298 || 46–45
|- align="center" bgcolor="ffbbbb"
| 92 || July 19 || @ Dodgers || 4–3 || Troncoso (4–0) || Hawkins (1–4) || Broxton (22) || 40,340 || 46–46
|- align="center" bgcolor="bbffbb"
| 93 || July 20 || Cardinals || 3–2 || Moehler (7–5) || Lohse (4–6) || Valverde (10) || 36,437 || 47–46
|- align="center" bgcolor="bbffbb"
| 94 || July 21 || Cardinals || 11–6 || Rodríguez (10–6) || Wellemeyer (7–8) || || 33,140 || 48–46
|- align="center" bgcolor="bbffbb"
| 95 || July 22 || Cardinals || 4–3 || Valverde (1–2) || Franklin (2–1) || || 37,619 || 49–46
|- align="center" bgcolor="bbffbb"
| 96 || July 24 || Mets || 5–4 || Hampton (6–7)|| Santana (11–8) || Valverde (11) || 42,967 || 50–46
|- align="center" bgcolor="ffbbbb"
| 97 || July 25 || Mets || 10–3 || Niese (1–0) || Ortiz (3–5) || || 43,302 || 50–47
|- align="center" bgcolor="ffbbbb"
| 98 || July 26 || Mets || 8–3 || Hernández (7–5) || Moehler (7–6) || Green (1) || 34,642 || 50–48
|- align="center" bgcolor="ffbbbb"
| 99 || July 27 || @ Cubs || 5–1 (13) || Samardzija (1–1) || Sampson (4–2) || || 40,794 || 50–49
|- align="center" bgcolor="bbffbb"
| 100 || July 28 || @ Cubs || 11–6 || Fulchino  || Guzmán || || 40,814 || 51–49
|- align="center" bgcolor="ffbbbb"
| 101 || July 29 || @ Cubs || 12–0 || Wells (7–4) || Hampton (6–8) || || 41,538 || 51–50
|- align="center" bgcolor="ffbbbb"
| 102 || July 30 || @ Cubs || 12–3 || Hart (3–1) || Ortiz (3–6) || || 41,524 || 51–51
|- align="center" bgcolor="ffbbbb"
| 103 || July 31 || @ Cardinals || 4–3 || Miller (3–0) || Arias (2–1) || Franklin || 43,760 || 51–52
|-

|-  bgcolor="ffbbbb"
|- align="center" bgcolor="ffbbbb"
| 104 || August 1 || @ Cardinals || 3–1 || Carpenter (10–3) || Fulchino (4–4) || || 45,074 || 51–53
|- align="center" bgcolor="bbffbb"
| 105 || August 2 || @ Cardinals || 2–0 || Norris (1–0) || Wainwright || Valverde (12) || 45,227 || 52–53
|- align="center" bgcolor="bbffbb"
| 106 || August 3 || Giants || 4–3 || Hampton (7–8) || Cain (12–3) || Valverde (13) || 29,835 || 53–53
|- align="center" bgcolor="ffbbbb"
| 107 || August 4 || Giants || 8–1 || Sánchez (5–9) || Paulino (2–6) || || 29,747 || 53–54
|- align="center" bgcolor="ffbbbb"
| 108 || August 5 || Giants || 10–6 ||  Martinez (2–0) || Moehler (7–7) || || 31,710 || 53–55
|- align="center" bgcolor="bbffbb"
| 109 || August 7 || Brewers || 6–3 || Norris (2–0) || Carlos Villanueva (2–9) || || 34,691 || 54–55
|- align="center" bgcolor="ffbbbb"
| 110 || August 8 || Brewers || 12–5 || Manny Parra (7–8) || Hampton (7–9) || || 35,216 || 54–56
|- align="center" bgcolor="bbffbb"
| 111 || August 9 || Brewers || 2–0 || Rodríguez (11–6) || Gallardo (10–9) || Valverde (15) || 32,262 || 55–56
|- align="center" bgcolor="ffbbbb"
| 112 || August 10 || @ Marlins || 8–6 || VandenHurk (2–1) || Moehler (7–8) || Núñez (12) || 12,325 || 55–57
|- align="center" bgcolor="ffbbbb"
| 113 || August 11 || @ Marlins || 9–8 (11) || Sanchez (3–1) || Wright (2–2) || || 13,312 || 55–58
|- align="center" bgcolor="bbffbb"
| 114 || August 12 || @ Marlins || 14–6 || Norris (3–0) || Nolasco (8–8) || || 21,122 || 56–58
|- align="center" bgcolor="ffbbbb"
| 115 || August 13 || @ Marlins || 9–2 || West (4–4) || Hampton (7–10) || || 14,047 || 56–59
|- align="center" bgcolor="ffbbbb"
| 116 || August 14 || @ Brewers || 11–2 || Gallardo (11–9) || Rodríguez (11–7) || || 37,715 || 56–60
|- align="center" bgcolor="ffbbbb"
| 117 || August 15 || @ Brewers || 6–2 || Burns (3–4) || Moehler (7–9) || || 42,952 || 56–61
|- align="center" bgcolor="bbffbb"
| 118 || August 16 || @ Brewers || 8–5 || Fulchino (5–4) || Weathers (3–4) || Valverde (16) || 41,863 || 57–61
|- align="center" bgcolor="ffbbbb"
| 119 || August 18 || Marlins || 6–2 ||Nolasco (9–8)  || Norris (3–1) || || 30,189 || 57–62
|- align="center" bgcolor="bbffbb"
| 120 || August 19 || Marlins || 6–3 || Gervacio (1–0) || West (4–5) || Valverde (17) || 30,101 || 58–62
|- align="center" bgcolor="bbffbb"
| 121 || August 20 || Marlins || 4–1 || Rodríguez (12–7) || Johnson (12–3) || Valverde (18) || 30,039 || 59–62
|- align="center" bgcolor="bbffbb"
| 122 || August 21 || Diamondbacks || 1–0 || Oswalt (7–4) || Petit (2–8) || Valverde (19) || 30,032 || 60–62
|- align="center" bgcolor="bbffbb"
| 123 || August 22 || Diamondbacks || 4–2 || Moehler (8–9) || Scherzer (7–8) || Hawkins || 39,412 || 61–62
|- align="center" bgcolor="ffbbbb"
| 124 || August 23 || Diamondbacks || 7–5 || Jon Garland (7–11) || Norris (3–2) || Qualls (23) || 30,612 || 61–63
|- align="center" bgcolor="ffbbbb"
| 125 || August 25 || @ Cardinals || 1–0 || Wainwright (15–7) || Rodríguez (11–7) || Franklin (33) || 40,512 || 61–64
|- align="center" bgcolor="ffbbbb"
| 126 || August 26 || @ Cardinals || 3–2 || Piñeiro (13–9) || Oswalt (7–4) || Franklin (34) || 40,311 || 61–65
|- align="center" bgcolor="bbffbb"
| 127 || August 27 || @ Cardinals || 4–3 || Valverde (2–2) || McClellan (4–3) || || 40,348 || 62–65
|- align="center" bgcolor="ffbbbb"
| 128 || August 28 || @ Diamondbacks || 14–7 || Scherzer ((8–8) || Bazardo (0–1) || || 26,190 || 62–66
|- align="center" bgcolor="ffbbbb"
| 129 || August 29 || @ Diamondbacks || 9–0 || Garland (8–11) || Norris (3–3) || || 37,190 || 62–67
|- align="center" bgcolor="ffbbbb"
| 130 || August 30 || @ Diamondbacks || 4–3 || Haren (13–8) || Rodríguez (12–9) || Qualls (24) || 29,062 || 62–68
|- align="center" bgcolor="bbffbb"
| 131 || August 31 || @ Cubs || 5–3 || Oswalt (8–5) || Harden (8–8) || Valverde (20) || 36,990 || 63–68
|-

|-  bgcolor="ffbbbb"
|- align="center" bgcolor="ffbbbb"
| 132 || September 1 || @ Cubs || 4–1 || Wells (10–7) || Moehler (8–10) || Mármol (7) || 36,332 || 63–69
|- align="center" bgcolor="ffbbbb"
| 133 || September 2 || @ Cubs || 2–0 || Lilly (10–8) || Paulino (2–0) || Mármol (8) || 39,192 || 63–70
|- align="center" bgcolor="bbffbb"
| 134 || September 4 || Phillies || 7–0 || Rodríguez (13–9) || Lee (12–11) || || 30,043 || 64–70
|- align="center" bgcolor="bbffbb"
| 135 || September 5 || Phillies || 5–4 || Valverde (3–2) || Lidge (0–7) || || 35,195 || 65–70
|- align="center" bgcolor="bbffbb"
| 136 || September 6 || Phillies || 4–3 || Norris (3–3) || Cole Hamels (8–9) || Valverde (3–2) || 34,754 || 66–70
|- align="center" bgcolor="bbffbb"
| 137 || September 7 || Phillies || 4–3 || Wright (3–2) || Park (3–3) || Valverde (22) || 29,040 || 67–70
|- align="center" bgcolor="ffbbbb"
| 138 || September 8 || Braves || 2–1 || Vázquez (12–9) || Paulino (2–8) || Soriano (22) || 26,081 || 67–71
|- align="center" bgcolor="bbffbb"
| 139 || September 9 || Braves || 2–1 || Valverde (4–2) (4–3) || Soriano (1–5)) || || 22,392 || 68–71
|- align="center" bgcolor="ffbbbb"
| 140 || September 10 || Braves || 9–7 || Lowe (14–9) || Oswalt (8–6) || Gonzalez (10) || 26,552 || 68–72
|- align="center" bgcolor="bbffbb"
| 141 || September 11 || Pirates || 9–1 || Norris (5–3) || Morton (3–8) || || 31,302 || 69–72
|- align="center" bgcolor="bbffbb"
| 142 || September 12 || Pirates || 4–2 || Jeff Fulchino (6–4) || Ross Ohlendorf (11–10) || Valverde (22) || 35,213 || 70–72
|- align="center" bgcolor="ffbbbb"
| 143 || September 13 || Pirates || 2–1 || Maholm (8–8) || Paulino (2–9) || Capps (25) ||  34,405|| 70–73
|- align="center" bgcolor="ffbbbb"
| 144 || September 14 || @ Reds || 3–1 || Arroyo (13–12) || Rodríguez (13–9) || Cordero (36) || 9,852 || 70–74
|- align="center" bgcolor="ffbbbb"
| 145 || September 15 || @ Reds || 5–4 || Herrera (4–4) || Gervacio (1–1) || Cordero (36) || 11,923 || 70–75
|- align="center" bgcolor="ffbbbb"
| 146 || September 16 || @ Reds || 6–5 || Burton (1–0) || Wright (3–3) || Cordero (37) || 10,662 || 70–76
|- align="center" bgcolor="ffbbbb"
| 147 || September 18 || @ Brewers || 3–2 || Weathers (4–5)) || Wright (3–4) || Hoffman (34) || 39,057 || 70–77
|- align="center" bgcolor="ffbbbb"
| 148 || September 19 || @ Brewers || 7–2 || Suppan (7–10) || Gervacio (1–2) || || 36,399 || 70–78
|- align="center" bgcolor="ffbbbb"
| 149 || September 20 || @ Brewers || 6–0 || Gallardo (13–12) || Paulino (2–10) || Manager fired || 30,024 || 70–79
|- align="center" bgcolor="ffbbbb"
| 150 || September 21 || Cardinals || 7–3 || Lohse (6–8) || Rodríguez (13–11) || || 34,705 || 70–80
|- align="center" bgcolor="ffbbbb"
| 151 || September 22 || Cardinals || 11–2 || Piñeiro (15–11) || Bazardo (0–2) || || 32,644 || 70–81
|- align="center" bgcolor="bbffbb"
| 152 || September 23 || Cardinals || 3–0 || Norris (6–3) || Smoltz (3–7) || Valverde (24) || 38,732 || 71–81
|- align="center" bgcolor="ffbbbb"
| 153 || September 25 || Reds || 10–4 || Maloney (2–4) || Moehler (8–11) || || 37,710 || 71–82
|- align="center" bgcolor="ffbbbb"
| 154 || September 26 || Reds || 10–4 || Lehr (5–2) || Paulino (2–11) || || 39,476 || 71–83
|- align="center" bgcolor="bbffbb"
| 155 || September 27 || Reds || 3–2 || Rodríguez (14–11) || Cuero (10–11) || Valverde (25) || 37,595 || 72–83
|- align="center" bgcolor="bbffbb"
| 156 || September 28 || @ Phillies || 8–2 || Bazardo (1–2) || Cole Hamels (10–10) || || 45,146 || 73–83
|- align="center" bgcolor="bbffbb"
| 157 || September 29 || @ Phillies || 7–4 || Happ (12–4) || López (0–1) || || 44,905 || 74–83
|- align="center" bgcolor="ffbbbb"
| 158 || September 30 || @ Phillies || 10–3 || Kendrick (3–1) || Moehler (8–12) || || 45,207 || 74–84
|-

|-  bgcolor="ffbbbb"
|- align="center" bgcolor="ffbbbb"
| 159 || October 1 || @ Phillies || 7–0 || Paulino (2–11) || Lee (14–13) || || 44,905 || 74–85
|- align="center" bgcolor="ffbbbb"
| 160 || October 2 || @ Mets || 7–1 || Maine (7–6) || Rodríguez (14–12) || || 37,576 || 74–86
|- align="center" bgcolor="ffbbbb"
| 161 || October 3 || @ Mets || 5–1 || Misch (3–4) || Bazardo (1–3) || F Rodríguez (35) || 37,578 || 74–87
|- align="center" bgcolor="ffbbbb"
| 162 || October 4 || @ Mets || 4–0 || Figueroa (3–8) || López (0–2) || || 38,135 || 74–88
|-

Roster

Player stats

Note: Team batting and pitching leaders are in bold.

Batting
Note: Pos = Position; G = Games played; AB = At bats; R = Runs scored; H = Hits; 2B = Doubles; 3B = Triples; HR = Home runs; RBI = Runs batted in; AVG = Batting average; SB = Stolen bases

Pitching
Note: W = Wins; L = Losses; ERA = Earned run average; G = Games pitched; GS = Games started; SV = Saves; IP = Innings pitched; R = Runs allowed; ER = Earned runs allowed; BB = Walks allowed; SO = Strikeouts; WHIP = (Walks+hits) per innings pitched

Farm system

References

External links

2009 Houston Astros season Official Site
2009 Houston Astros season at Baseball Reference

Houston Astros seasons
Houston Astros
2009 in sports in Texas